East Walnut Hills Firehouse is a registered historic building in Cincinnati, Ohio, listed in the National Register on February 17, 1983. It is in the East Walnut Hills neighborhood. 

Built in 1886, it accommodated the Fire Company No. 23 and Ladder Company No. 9.

Notes 

Fire stations completed in 1886
Fire stations on the National Register of Historic Places in Ohio
National Register of Historic Places in Cincinnati
Buildings and structures in Cincinnati
1886 establishments in Ohio